Dirhinus is a genus of parasitic wasps in the family Chalcididae. The genus has a worldwide distribution.

These chalcids are parasitoids of flies; most of the host species are flies that develop in vertebrate corpses, and many are associated with humans (Calliphoridae, Sarcophagidae and Muscidae). Flies from the Tephritidae and Glossinidae are also parasitized.

Female Dirhinus wasps target the host flies while they pupate in the soil (after the larval stage is complete); the wasp reaches the pupa by digging in the soil with her horns and an egg is laid on the body of the fly pupa, within its puparium.

Species

There are about 70 described species:

References

Hymenoptera genera
Chalcidoidea